Ayoreo is a Zamucoan language spoken in both Paraguay and Bolivia. It is also known as Morotoco, Moro, Ayoweo, Ayoré, and Pyeta Yovai. However, the name "Ayoreo" is more common in Bolivia, and "Morotoco" in Paraguay. It is spoken by Ayoreo, an indigenous ethnic group traditionally living on a combined hunter-gatherer and farming lifestyle.

Classification
Ayoreo is classified as a Zamucoan language, along with Chamacoco.  Extinct Guarañoca may have been a dialect.

Geographic distribution
Ayoreo is spoken in both Paraguay and Bolivia, with 3,100 speakers total, 1700 of those in Paraguay and 1,400 in Bolivia. Within Paraguay, Ayoreo is spoken in the Chaco Department and the northern parts of the Alto Paraguay Department. In Bolivia, it is spoken in the Gran Chaco Province, in the Santa Cruz Department.

Phonology
Bertinetto (2009) reports that Ayoreo has the 5 vowels /a, e, i, o, u/, which appear both as oral and nasal.

/j/ can also be heard as [dʒ].

Grammar
The prototypical constituent order is subject-verb-object, as seen in the following examples (Bertinetto 2009:45-46):

Ayoreo is a fusional language.

Verbs agree with their subjects, but there is no tense-inflection. Consider the following paradigm, which has prefixes marking person and suffixes marking number (Bertinetto 2009:29):

When the verb root contains a nasal, there are nasalized variants of the agreement affixes:

Ayoreo is a mood-prominent language. Nouns can be divided into possessable and non-possessable; possessor agreement is expressed through a prefixation. The syntax of Ayoreo is characterized by the presence of para-hypotactical structures.

Notes

References
Bertinetto, Pier Marco 2009. Ayoreo (Zamuco). A grammatical sketch. Quaderni del Laboratorio di Linguistica della Scuola Normale Superiore di Pisa. 8 n.s.
Bertinetto, Pier Marco & Luca Ciucci 2012. Parataxis, Hypotaxis and Para-Hypotaxis in the Zamucoan Languages. In: Linguistic Discovery 10.1: 89-111.
Briggs, Janet R. 1972. Quiero contarles unos casos del Beni. Summer Institute of Linguistics in collaboration with the Ministerio de Educación y Cultura, Dirección Nacional de Antropología. Cochabamba
Briggs, Janet R. 1973. Ayoré narrative analysis. International Journal of American Linguistics 39. 155-63.
Ciucci, Luca. 2007/8a.  Indagini sulla morfologia verbale dell'ayoreo.  Quaderni del Laboratorio di Linguistica della Scuola Normale 7.
Ciucci, Luca 2010. La flessione possessiva dell'ayoreo. Quaderni del Laboratorio di Linguistica della Scuola Normale Superiore di Pisa, n.s. 9,2
Higham, Alice; Morarie, Maxine; and Greta Paul. 2000. Ayoré-English dictionary, 3 volumes. Sanford, FL: New Tribes Mission.
Sušnik, Branislava J. 1963. La lengua de los Ayoweos - Moros. Etnolingüística 8 (Boletín de la Sociedad Científica del Paraguay y del Museo Etnográfico). Asunción 8: 1- 148.
Sušnik, Branislava J. 1973. La lengua de los Ayoweo-Moros. Estructura gramatical y fraseario etnográfico. Asunción: Museo Etnográfico “Andrés Barbero”.

External links

 The page provides colored linguistic maps (habitat, other language families).
Sorosoro Project
 Lenguas de Bolivia (online edition)
 ELAR archive of Documentation and Description of Paraguayan Ayoreo, a Language of the Chaco
 Ayoreo (Intercontinental Dictionary Series)

Languages of Bolivia
Languages of Paraguay
Indigenous languages of the South American Chaco
Zamucoan languages
Subject–verb–object languages
Chaco linguistic area